Vippach is a river in Thuringia, Germany. It flows into the Gramme near Kranichborn.

History
The Vippach rises east of the city of Neumark in the district of Weimarer Land and flows in a westerly direction through Neumark and Vippachedelhausen .

See also
List of rivers of Thuringia

Rivers of Thuringia
Rivers of Germany